The Colorado Division of Youth Services (formerly the Colorado Division of Youth Corrections) is a division of the Colorado Department of Human Services and is based in Denver. The division supervises and cares for youth the district courts commit to its custody. It operates ten detention or residential facilities for youth aged 10 to 21. The division also manages juvenile parole in Colorado.

References

External links
Official website

State agencies of Colorado
Colorado
Prisons in Colorado
Colorado